Clay Hill (born Clay Squire on May 17, 1976, in Hamilton, Ontario) is a professional box lacrosse player.  He was a member of the National Lacrosse League's Buffalo Bandits for seven seasons, where he won a NLL Championship in 2008.  He also played from 1997 until 2012 as a member of the Mann Cup-eligible Six Nations Chiefs.  Now, late in his career, he plays in the semi-professional Canadian Lacrosse League during the winter and the OLA Senior B Lacrosse League in the summer.

Career
Hill joined the Six Nations Chiefs of Major Series Lacrosse in 2002.  He was originally selected by the Bandits of the Major Indoor Lacrosse League in the 4th Round of the 1997 MILL Entry Draft but did not sign with the team until December 7, 2004.  He played his first NLL game in 2005.

In 2008, Hill played all 16 regular season games and all 3 playoff games as he, with the Buffalo Bandits, won the NLL Championship.

In 2011, Hill left the National Lacrosse League.  He played his final season as a member of the Six Nations Chiefs of Major Series Lacrosse in 2012, competing for the Mann Cup Senior A championship of Canada.  He and the Chiefs made it to the league finals before falling to the Peterborough Lakers. Completing his seventh season with the bandits, Hill has accumulated 61 points over the course of 99 games and played in a cumulative total of 10 playoff games for the Buffalo Bandits prior to retiring from the team.

In 2012, Hill joined the Ohsweken Demons of the Canadian Lacrosse League.  He and the Demons would go on to win the inaugural CLax Championship.  For his play, the league named him to the league's second all-star team.

Family 
Clay Hill was raised in the Six Nations (a First Nations Reserve), in one of the Iroquois Nations.  The main reserve where Clay Hill is born is found between the cities of Brantford, Caledonia, and Hagersville. The land includes around 18,000 hectares of land. In the summer, Hill travels through the Toronto area to look for job opportunities, particularly steel construction, to support his family when he is in offseason.

Statistics

NLL
Statistics provided by: http://www.nll.com/.

CLA/CLax
Statistics provided by: https://web.archive.org/web/20140224031603/http://wampsbibleoflacrosse.com/

References

External links
Clay Hill's profile at NLL.com

1976 births
Living people
Buffalo Bandits players
Canadian lacrosse players
Canadian Mohawk people
First Nations sportspeople
Iroquois nations lacrosse players
Lacrosse people from Ontario
Sportspeople from Hamilton, Ontario
Six Nations of the Grand River